Arty Hill is an American country music singer-songwriter of the Honky-tonk tradition. His work has been covered by several artists including Jason & the Scorchers and the Kenny and Amanda Smith Band.

Discography

Albums
 Baltimore Reasons, 2003
 Back on the Rail, 2005
 Bar of Gold, 2008 (Cow Island Music)
 Back on the Rail: reissue, 2009 (Cow Island Music)
 Montgomery on My Mind: The Hank EP, 2009 (Cow Island Music)
 Pie for Breakfast: Riffs, Roughs, and Radio, 2010
 Another Lost Highway, 2010 (featuring Jonathan Gregg and Dave Giegerich of The Linemen)
 Heart on my Dirty Sleeve, 2014
 Live: Church on Saturday Night, 2016

References

External links
 

Living people
American country singer-songwriters
American male singers
Year of birth missing (living people)